Dato' Sri Jailani Johari (Jawi: جايلاني جوهري; born 2 August 1965) is a Malaysian politician who previously served as Deputy Minister of Communication and Multimedia under the Barisan Nasional administration of then Prime Minister, Najib Razak from 2013 to 2018. He is a member of the United Malays National Organisation (UMNO), a component party of the BN administration.

Personal life
Jailani Johari was born in Ajil, Terengganu. He is a graduate of University Malaya. He was admitted as an Advocate & Solicitor of the High Court Malaya in 1989. His career at the Malaysian Bar spans more than 25 years. His practice covers a wide breadth of areas includes Criminal & Civil Litigation, Commercial and Corporate Law.

He is married to Datin Sri Siti Nurbiha Mohd Bisharuddin and has been blessed with 5 children namely Amir Haziq, Arif Danial, Adriana Batrisyia, Amira Sofea and Adiba Marsya.

Political career
Jailani has served as a Member of Parliament Malaysia from 2013 to 2018. He held several senior positions throughout his career. He has in recent times paved his way into Commissions namely Commodity, Securities and Communications and Multimedia. He  notched up everything under his belt prior to being appointed as the Deputy Minister of Ministry of Communication and Multimedia from 2013 to 2018. He has vast experience in Cyber Law and as a Lawmaker during his term of service with Ministry of Communication and Multimedia and Communications and Multimedia Commission (MCMC).

He headed delegation for  UPU Congress in Doha under the theme “New World, New Strategy“ in 2012. He was elected as the  member of the Postal Operations Council (POC) in Bern from 2013 to 2016 consisting of  40 countries. He was appointed as  the Chairman of  Communications and Media Relations Committee (JCOMM) by Malaysian Government to manage the coordination and communication  for the MH370 and later MH17 tragedies. He was also  a  committee member of MH370 High-Level Technical Task Force (HLTTF) involved in search operation coordinated by the Australian Maritime Safety Authority (AMSA) moved to an underwater phase led by the Joint Agency Coordination Centre (JACC) and the Australian Transport Safety Bureau (ATSB).

Election results

Honours
  :
  Knight Companion of the Order of the Crown of Pahang (DIMP) – Dato' (2007)
  Grand Knight of the Order of Sultan Ahmad Shah of Pahang (SSAP) – Dato' Sri (2017)
  :
  Knight Companion of the Order of Sultan Mizan Zainal Abidin of Terengganu (DSMZ) – Dato' (2011)

See also

 Hulu Terengganu (federal constituency)

References

Living people
1965 births
People from Terengganu
Malaysian people of Malay descent
Malaysian Muslims
Members of the Dewan Rakyat
United Malays National Organisation politicians